Haouch Tall Safiyeh or Haouch Tal Safiya (حوش تل صفية)  is a village and an archaeological site 3 km southwest of Yaate near Baalbek in Baalbek-Hermel Governorate. It dates at least to the Neolithic period. The village is mostly Shiite, with 499 Shiite voters, 171 Maronites and 14 Sunnis.

History
In 1838, Eli Smith noted  Haush Tell Safiyeh  as a Metawileh village in the Baalbek area.

References

Bibliography

Populated places in Baalbek District
Shia Muslim communities in Lebanon
Neolithic settlements
Bronze Age sites in Lebanon